Jason Byrne may refer to:

Jason Byrne (comedian) (born 1972), Irish comedian and radio host
Jason Byrne (footballer) (born 1978), Irish footballer
Jason Byrne (writer), author of the book Guide to Webcams